Archdale-Trinity News is a weekly newspaper based in Archdale, North Carolina covering northwest Randolph County, North Carolina. It is owned by Paxton Media Group along with area papers the High Point Enterprise and the Thomasville Times.

See also
 List of newspapers in North Carolina

References

External links
Archdale-Trinity News

Weekly newspapers published in North Carolina
Randolph County, North Carolina